Morley was a parliamentary constituency centred on the town of Morley in the West Riding of Yorkshire.  It returned one Member of Parliament (MP) to the House of Commons of the Parliament of the United Kingdom, elected by the first past the post system.

History 

The constituency was created when the two-member Southern West Riding of Yorkshire constituency was divided by the Redistribution of Seats Act 1885 for the 1885 general election.  It was abolished for the 1918 general election, when it was partly replaced by the new Batley and Morley constituency.

Members of Parliament

Elections

Elections in the 1880s

Elections in the 1890s

Elections in the 1900s

Elections in the 1910s 

General Election 1914–15:

Another General Election was required to take place before the end of 1915. The political parties had been making preparations for an election to take place and by the July 1914, the following candidates had been selected; 
Liberal: Gerald France
Labour:

References

 British Parliamentary Election Results 1885-1918, compiled and edited by F.W.S. Craig (Macmillan Press 1974)

Parliamentary constituencies in Yorkshire and the Humber (historic)
Constituencies of the Parliament of the United Kingdom established in 1885
Constituencies of the Parliament of the United Kingdom disestablished in 1918
Morley, West Yorkshire